Asteropetes is a monotypic moth genus of the family Noctuidae erected by George Hampson in 1901. Its only species, Asteropetes noctuina, was first described by Arthur Gardiner Butler in 1878. It is found on the Kuriles and in Japan.

The wingspan is 42–46 mm.

The larvae feed on the leaves of Vitis (grapevine) species.

References

External links
 "Importation of Grapes (Vitis spp.) from Korea into the United States".

Monotypic moth genera
Agaristinae
Moths of Japan